Wander Luiz Queiroz Dias, or simply Wander Luiz (born 17 February 1992) is a Brazilian professional footballer who plays as a forward.

Club career

Long An
In 2017, Luiz signed for Long An and was given jersey number 79. He made his league debut on 24 June 2017 against Ho Chi Minh City. On 10 September, Luiz scored his first goal for the club, scoring in a 2–3 lose over Quảng Nam in the 2017 V.League 1.

Quảng Nam
In 2018, Luiz left Long An for Quảng Nam. He made his league debut on 10 March 2018 against Saigon. He only made two appearances with the club.

Cần Thơ
After leaving Quảng Nam, Luiz joined Cần Thơ. He made his league debut on 22 March 2018 against Becamex Bình Dương. On 15 April, Luiz scored his first two goals for the club in a 3–3 draw over Sông Lam Nghệ An.

Becamex Bình Dương
In 2019, Luiz signed for Becamex Bình Dương. He made his league debut on 21 February 2019 against Thanh Hóa. On 12 March, Luiz scored his first international goal for the team, scoring in a 1–3 lose over Philippines Football League club Ceres-Negros in the 2019 AFC Cup group stage. On 3 April, he scored in a 1–2 win over Myanmar National League club Shan United in the AFC Cup. Five days later, he scored his league goal for the club, scoring in a 1–0 win over Viettel in the 2019 V.League 1.

Persib Bandung
On 10 February 2020, Luiz moved to Indonesia and signed one-year contract with Liga 1 club Persib Bandung. He made his league debut for Persib Bandung on 1 March in a win 3–0 against Persela Lamongan. He also scored his first goal for Persib with scored a brace in 2020 Liga 1, where he scored in the 54th and 70th minutes. On 8 March, Luiz scored in a 1–2 win over Arema, and on 15 March he scored in a 2–1 over PSS Sleman; the latter result saw Persib Bandung move to 1st position in the league table, the first time under Robert Alberts. And then, this season was suspended on 27 March 2020 due to the COVID-19 pandemic. The season was abandoned and was declared void on 20 January 2021.

2021 season
On 4 September, Luiz made his debut of the new league season match against Barito Putera at the Indomilk Arena, Tangerang. On 22 October, Luiz scored his first league goals of the season with scored two goals in a 4–2 win over PSS Sleman at the Manahan Stadium. Eight days later, Luiz scored a brace in a 3–0 win against Persipura Jayapura, the latter result saw Persib Bandung move to 1st position in the league table. On 16 December, PT Persib Bermartabat revealed that Luiz would leave the club at the end of the first round of Liga 1 in December.

PSS Sleman
On 26 December 2021, Luiz signed a contract with PSS Sleman. On 13 January 2022, Luiz made his league debut in 0–2 lose against Arema at the Kapten I Wayan Dipta Stadium.

Honours

Club
Quảng Nam
 Vietnamese Super Cup: 2017

References

External links
 

1992 births
Living people
Brazilian footballers
Brazilian expatriate footballers
Association football forwards
Liga 1 (Indonesia) players
Persib Bandung players
PSS Sleman players
RANS Nusantara F.C. players
V.League 1 players
Becamex Binh Duong FC players
Can Tho FC players
Quang Nam FC players
Long An FC players
Associação Atlética Santa Rita players
Esporte Clube Primeiro Passo Vitória da Conquista players
Expatriate footballers in Vietnam
Brazilian expatriate sportspeople in Vietnam
Expatriate footballers in Indonesia
Brazilian expatriate sportspeople in Indonesia